This is a list of universities and colleges in Kenya. Kenya has a number of universities and other institutions of higher learning. There are 30 public universities, 30 chartered private universities and 30 universities with Letter of Interim Authority (LIA).

These universities are established through institutional Acts of Parliament under the Universities Act, 2012 which provides for the development of university education, the establishment, accreditation and governance of universities. According to a 2004 report on reforming higher education in Kenya, the rapid expansion of university education in the country was a spontaneous response to the increasing demand for higher education necessitated by the increasing flow of students from schools.

From July 2014, all government and private institutions offering technical and vocational education and training were put under TVET (Technical and Vocational Education and Training). This act normalized this sector as it had become tainted by unaccredited institutions offering substandard education as revealed by The Standard and The Star.  there were 540 institutions accredited by the Authority.

Public universities

Private universities

Others

Technical and Vocational Education and Training Institutions
East Africa Institute of Certified Studies
Africa Digital Media Institute - ADMI 
 AirSwiss International College
Amboseli Institute of Hospitality and Technology - Thika, Nakuru
 Nairobi Institute of Software Development
 Nairobi Industrial Institute Collage
 Atlas College -Eastleigh Nairobi
Kenya Institute of Highways and Building Technology (KIHBT)- Nairob
 Adept College of Professional Studies - Nakuru.
African Institute of Research and Development Studies, Bandari College
Baraton Teachers' Training College - Nandi Central Kapsabet
Consolata Cathedral Institute -Nyeri
Cascade Institute of Hospitality - Thika
ELDORET TECHNICAL TRAINING INSTITUTE
Eldoret Polytechnic - Eldoret
 Emma Daniel Arts Training Institute (EDATI)
 Government Training Institute (GTI) 
Gusii Institute of Technology
 Harvard Institute of Development Studies - Thika
 Hemland College of Professional and Technical Studies - Thika
ICT Fire and Rescue - Thika
Indian Institute of Hardware Technology- IIHT Westlands, Nairobi
 International Centre of Technology (ICT-Thika) - Thika
 Intraglobal Training Institute -Nairobi CBD
Intraglobal Training Institute -Kisumu
Intraglobal Training Institute -Kisii
Intraglobal Training Institute -Embu
Intraglobal Training Institute -Nakuru
Intraglobal Training Institute -Donholm
 Jaffery Institute of Professional Studies - Mombasa
Kabete National Polytechnic
Kagumo College
 Kaiboi Technical Training Institute
 The Kenya College of Science and Technology
 Kenya Forestry College - Londiani
 Kenya Forestry Research Institute
 Keshnya School of Government (Formerly Kenya Institute of Administration (KIA))
 Kenya Institute of Biomedical Sciences and Technology - Nakuru
 Kenya Institute of Management (KIM)
 Kenya Institute of Mass Communication - South C
 Kenya Institute of Monitoring and Evaluation Studies (KIMES) - Nakuru
 Kenya Institute of Software Engineering - Thika
 Kenya Medical Training Centre (KMTC)
 Kenya School of Government
 Kenya School of Medical Science and Technology 
 Kenya School of Monetary Studies - Ruaraka
 Kenya Science Teachers College, University of Nairobi
 Kenya Technical Teachers College (KTTC)
 Kenya Utalii College
 Kenya Water Institute - South C, Nairobi
 Kenya Wildlife Service Training Institute - Naivasha
 Kiambu Institute of Science and Technology
 Kigari Teachers College - Embu
 Kilimambogo Teachers College - Kilimambogo
 Kipkabus Technical and Vocational College (KTVC)
 Kisumu Polytechnic - Makasembo
 Kitale Technical Institute - Kitale
 Machakos Institute of Technology - Machakos
 Mboya Labour College - Kisumu
 Michuki Technical Institute - Muranga
 Nairobi Aviation College - Kisumu Campus 
 Nakuru Counseling & Training Institute - Nakuru
PC Kinyanjui Technical Training Institute (PCKTTI)
 Railway Training Institute - South B, Nairobi
 Ramogi Institute of Advanced Technology - Kisumu
 Rift Valley Technical Training Institute - Nakuru
 Sacred Training Institute - Bungoma and Nairobi Campuses
 Savannah Institute for Business and Informatics - Nakuru
 Sensei Institute of Technology for Plant Operator Training
 Sirisia Youth Polytechnic
 Teachers College
 Technical Training Institute (MTTI) - Mombasa
 The Thika Technical Training Institute - Thika
 Techno Links Ltd
 United Africa College - Nairobi
 Rift Valley Institute of Science & Technology - Nakuru
 Vision Empowerment Training Institute- Nairobi
 Vision Empowerment Training Institute- Kitengela
 Vision Stars Training Institute - Nairobi
Kenya Institute of Development Studies (K.I.D.S.) - Nairobi
Kenya Christian Industrial Training Institute- KCITI

Proprietary schools 
 Africa College of Social Work
 African Institute of Research and Development Studies
 AirSwiss International College - Nairobi
 Airways Travel Institute
 Alphax College - Eldoret
 Amani College
 Arkline College - Nairobi
 Associated Computer Services - Development House, Nairobi
 AUGAB Computer College - Garissa
 Augustana College - Kasarani - Nairobi
 Australian Studies Institute (AUSI) - Westlands, Nairobi
 Bell Institute of Technology - Nairobi
 Belmont International College-Ongata Rongai - Kajiado
 Bible College of East Africa, Kasarani - Nairobi
 BizSmart Inter Technology
 Bungoma Technical Training Institute - Bungoma
 Career Training Centre - Nairobi
 Cascade Institute of Hospitality - Thika
 Centre for Distance & Online Learning  - Nairobi
 Century Park College - Machakos
 Coast Institute of Technology
 College of Management Sciences - Nairobi CBD
 Compuera College - Nairobi
 Compugoal College - Nairobi
 Computer Learning Centre (CLC) - Nairobi
 Computer Pride Training Centre - Nairobi
 Computer Training Centre - Nairobi
 NEWVIEW COLLEGE - Nairobi
 Intraglobal Training Institute- Nairobi
 Consolata Cathedral Institute -Nyeri
 Consolata Institute of Communication and Technology  - Nyeri-Mathari
 Cornerstone Training Institute - Nairobi
 Digital Resource Center (DRC) - Karama Estate, Nakuru
 Digiworld Computer School - Meru
 Don Bosco Boy's Town - Karen
 Don Bosco Institute of Management Studies, Nairobi
 Duolotech Computers  - Gachie and Thika
 Eagle Air Aviation College (EAAC) - Ongata Rongai
 Eagle College of Management Studies
 East Africa Institute of Certified Studies - Nairobi
 East Africa School of Journalism (EASJ) - Jamuhuri show ground
 East Africa School of Management - Nairobi
 East Africa Vision Institute
 East African Media Institute (EAMI) - Nairobi
 East African School of Aviation - Embakasi, Nairobi
 ELDORET TECHNICAL TRAINING INSTITUTE- Eldoret
 Eldoret Aviation Training Institute - Eldoret
 Elite Centre - Embakasi - Nairobi, Mlolongo next to Co-operative Bank, Stepup Training Institute, Nakuru 
 Elite Commercial Institute - Embakasi, Syokimau, satellite branches
 Elix Centre of Informatics -  Lokichar-Turkana
 Emanex Computer College - Kahawa
 Esmart College - Kikuyu Town
 Felma College - Nairobi - Embakasi
 German Institute of Professional Studies - Nairobi
 Globoville Shanzu Beach College - Mombasa
 Graffins College - Westlands, Nairobi
 Gusii Institute of Technology - Kisii
 Hansons College of Professional Studies - Gachie Nairobi/Kuimbu
 Hemland Computer Institute – Thika, Thika Arcade 5th Floor
 Hi-tec Institute of Professional Studies -  Mombasa CBD
 Higher Institute of Development Studies - CBD, Nairobi
 Holy Rosary College - Tala
 ICT Fire and Rescue
 The iNet College - Bungoma Cooperative Bank Building, 3rd floor, Bungoma County
 Institute of Advanced Technology - Loita House, Loita Street, Buruburu, Nairobi
 Institute of Advanced Technology Campus - Westlands
 Institute of Business and Technology - Nakuru
 Institute of Information Technology Studies & Research - Nairobi, Ambank Hse, University Way
 Institute of Zaburi Technologies - Nairobi CBD
 Inter-Afrika Development Institute - NACICO Plaza 4th Floor, Nairobi
 International Centre of Technology (ICT-Thika) - Thika
 International College of Kenya - Nairobi/Machakos
 International Hotel & Tourism Institute - Nairobi
 InterWorld College - Nairobi
 Intraglobal Training Institute - Nairobi, Kisumu, Nakuru, Embu, Kisii
 Jodan College of Technology -  Thika
 Jogoo Commercial College -  Nakuru
 Karatina Institute of Technology (KIT-Karatina) - Karatina
 Keiway Mining & Technology College - Equity Bank Bldg, Mtwapa
 Kenair travel and related studies - Nairobi and Mombasa
 Kenya Aeronautical College (Aviation, Engineering & Cabin Crew) Wilson Airport - Nairobi
 Kenya Christian Industrial Training Institute (KCITI) - Eastleigh Campus
 Kenya College of Communications Technology - Mbagathi, Nairobi
 Kenya College of Medicine & Related Studies - Nairobi
 The Kenya College of Science and Technology
 Kenya College of Skills and Talent Development - Embakasi
 Kenya Institute of Administration (KIA) - Kabete
 Kenya Institute of Applied Sciences
 Kenya Institute of Biomedical Sciences and Technology (KIBSAT) - Nakuru
 Kenya Institute of Development Studies (KIDS) - Nairobi
 Kenya Institute of Management (KIM) - Nairobi
 Kenya Institute of Mass Communication - South C, Nairobi
 Kenya Institute of Media and Technology (KIMT) - Nairobi
 Kenya Institute of Professional Studies - Nairobi
 Kenya Institute of Social Work and Community Development (KISWCD) - CBD, Nairobi
 Kenya Institute of Special Education (KISE) - Kasarani, Nairobi
 Kenya School of Accountancy and Finance - Kitale and Kisii
 Kenya School of Professional Counseling & Behavioural Sciences (KSCBS)
 Kenya School of Professional Studies (KSPS) - Parklands, Nairobi
 Kenya School of Technology Studies (KSTS)- Thika
 Kenya Science Teachers College - Jamhuri, Nairobi
 Kenya Technical Teachers College – Gigiri, Nairobi
 Kenya Utalii College - Nairobi
 Kenya Water Institute - South C, Nairobi
 Kenya Wildlife Service Training Institute - Naivasha
 Kericho Teachers College – Kericho
 Kiambu Institute of Science and Technology – Kiambu
 Kigari Teachers College – Embu
 Kilimambogo Teachers College - Kilimambogo
 Kima International School of Theology (KIST) - Kima, Western Province of Kenya
 Kimathi Chambers 
 Kinyanjui Technical Training Institute - Riruta, Nairobi
 Kisumu Polytechnic - Makasembo, Kisumu
 Lake Region Business training and Consultancy - Naivasha, Kwa Muhia
 Lakeview Training Institute - Naivasha Kangiri House
 Language School in Kenya, The - Chania Avenue, Kilimani Nairobi</ref> http://www.languageschoolkenya.org</ref>
 Mark University of IT - Uganda
 Mawego Technical Institute - Kendu Bay
 Maxton College Of Media & Communications - Nairobi Umo
 Meru Technical Institute - Meru
 Migori Teachers college, Migori
 Mosoriot Teachers College – Eldoret
 Motion City International - Multimedia School, The Make Up Place
 Murang'a Institute of Technology – Murang'a
 Na rap Training Institute - Yaya Centre
 Nairobi Aviation College  - Nairobi
 Nairobi Film School - Kipande Road, opposite National Museum of Kenya
 Nairobi Institute of Business studies (NIBS)
 Nairobi Institute of Software Development - Nairobi
 Nairobi Institute of Technology Westlands
 Naivasha Computer & Business Studies College - Naivasha Kenya
 Nakuru College of Health Sciences and Management - KFA and Showground campuses, Nakuru
 Nakuru Counseling & Training Institute, Centre of Hope - Nakuru
 Nakuru Institute of Information Communication Technology
 Narok Teachers College – Narok
 Narok Teachers Training – Narok
 National Youth Service Engineering Institute - Nairobi
 Nationwide Hotel and Tourism College (NHTC) - Nakuru
 Neema Lutheran College -  Nyamira
 Nkabune Technical Institute
 Oshwal College - Parklands, Nairobi 
 Pan African School of Theology (PAST) - Nyahururu, Kenya
 PCEA Shalom Training College - Eastleigh, Nairobi
 Pioneer's Training Institute - Nairobi, Umoja
 PREMESE Africa Development Institute - Vision Plaza, Msa Road, Nairobi
 Premier College of Hospitality and Business Studies - Biashara Street
 Premier College of Professional Studies Ltd - Nairobi
 Prestige Academy and College -  Nakuru
 The Regional Institute of Business Management - Nairobi CBD
 Regional Centre For Tourism And Foreign language - Eagle House, opposite Tacos Club
 Regional Training Institute - CBD, Nairobi
 Regions Group International College
 Rift valley institute of business studies Nakuru and Kericho
 Rehoboth College - Nairobi, Ngumo area
 Riccatti Business College of East Africa
 Rift Valley Institute Of Science & Technology - Nakuru
 Rochester Business School - View Park Towers, Nairobi
 Royal Institute of Applied Sciences - Meru
 Sacred Lake Institute of Technology - Kiirua, along Meru Nanyuki Road
 Sagana Institute of Technology
 School of ICT & Hairdressing and Beauty  - Pioneer College
 School of Professional Studies - Parklands, Nairobi
 Shalom Information Technology Center - Shalom House, off Ngong Road, Nairobi
 Shanzu Teachers College - Shanzu, Mombasa
 Shepherds Foundation Education & Research Centre - Buruburu, Nairobi
 Skynet Business College - CBD, Nairobi
 Skypath Aviation College - Wilson Airport AMREF KCO building, Nairobi
 SMA Swiss Management Academy - New Muthaiga, Nairobi
 Softpro Computer Institute - Pipeline Tumaini S/mkt blg, 3rd floor, Pipeline (Embakasi)
 South Rift International College (SORICO) - AM Plaza, Kericho
 St. Andrew's Pre-Medical College - Mumbasa
 St. Joseph Vocational Training Centre - Mlolongo
 St Joseph's Medical training College - Nyabondo
 St. Mary's School of Clinical Medicine - Mumias
 Stanbridge College  - Voi
 Star Media Institute - South B Estate, Southgate Ctr 1st Floor, Nairobi
 Starnet College - Nairobi
 Stonebic College - Westlands, Nairobi
 Superior Group of Colleges Intl.
 Talent institute - Nairobi
 Tambach Teachers Training College - Kerio Valley, Rift Valley
 Tangaza College
 Taznaam Tutorial College - Nairobi
 Tec Institute of Management - Nairobi and Eldoret
 Thomas Asingo College of Computer and Business Management
 Times Training Centre -  Mombasa
 Universal Group of Colleges - Nairobi CBD
 Vision Institute of Professionals - Nairobi and Mombasa
 Vision Stars Training Institute
 Wang Point Technologies College of Information Technology
 Western College of Hospitality and Professional Studies - Wechaps College, Kisumu 
 Zetech College - Nairobi
 Kenyaplex Institute of Technology Mwala

References

External links
List of Public TVET Colleges in Kenya

Kenya
Kenya
Kenya education-related lists